K-268 is a  east–west state highway in the U.S. state of Kansas. K-268's western terminus is at U.S. Route 75 (US-75) and K-31 north of Lyndon, and the eastern terminus is at K-68 north of Quenemo. There are no cities or towns along the highway, but it is a part of a direct link for traffic between Osage City and Ottawa. K-268 travels mostly through rural farmlands and is a two-lane road its entire length.

Before state highways were numbered in Kansas there were auto trails. The western terminus was part of the former Capitol Route. K-268 was first designated a state highway on November 14, 1962, to connect Pomona State Park to the State Highway System, and its alignment has not changed since. In 2014, due to repeated accidents, the eastern terminus was converted from a four-way intersection to a roundabout.

Route description
The highway heads east through flat farmland for about  before reaching South California Road. The highway continues for  then crosses over Flint Hills Nature Trail, which was a former Missouri Pacific Railroad track. The roadway continues east through farmland with scattered areas of trees and soon intersects South Pomona Dam Road, which travels northeast and crosses the Pomona Lake dam. At this point it begins to curve to the southeast as the terrain becomes more hilly and covered with trees.  travels southeast for roughly  then curves back east and enters back into flat farmland.

The entire route is paved with full design bituminous pavement.

History
Around 1910, a national system of auto trails was created in the United States as well as in Canada. K-92's western terminus (US-75) follows the former Capitol Route, which travelled from Austin, Texas north to Omaha, Nebraska. In Kansas it began at Oklahoma border and travelled north through Independence, Lyndon, Topeka, and Horton to the Nebraska border.

The U.S. Army Corps of Engineers began to construct Pomona Dam and its associated reservoir in July 1959. By July 1962, construction on the dam was 65 percent completed. By October 1963, the dam had been completed and started to store water. The $10,535.14 (equivalent to $ in ) project was completed by Killough Construction Company of Ottawa.  and  first appear on the 1965 State Highway Map.

The western terminus was formerly a four-way intersection, and from January 2004 to August 2009, there was a total of 24 crashes, which included one fatality and fifteen that resulted in injuries. Residents of the surrounding communities requested a "safer type of intersection", then in late Fall of 2013, work began to reconstruct the intersection as a roundabout. On November 17, 2014, the new roundabout at the eastern terminus opened to unrestricted traffic. The project was fully completed by the end of December. Smoky Hill LLC from Salina, was the primary contractor on the $2.541 million (equivalent to $ in ) roundabout project. On August 9, 2018, a tractor-trailer travelling southbound on  crashed into the roundabout. The trucks fuel tank was damaged and spilled about 70 gallons of diesel fuel.  and  traffic was reduced to one lane for about four hours after the crash.

Major intersections

References

External links

Kansas Department of Transportation State Map
KDOT: Historic State Maps

268
Transportation in Osage County, Kansas